The 45th International 500-Mile Sweepstakes was held at the Indianapolis Motor Speedway in Speedway, Indiana on Tuesday, May 30, 1961. For the first time since 1949, the Indianapolis 500 was not recognized on the World Championship calendar. The race celebrated the 50th anniversary of the first Indy 500 in 1911.

Eddie Sachs and A. J. Foyt were battling for 1st-2nd in the latter stages of the race. On Foyt's final scheduled pit stop, his crew was unable to properly engage the fuel mechanism, and his car did not take on a full load of fuel. Foyt returned to the track, and was pulling away from Sachs. Foyt's car was running faster due to the light fuel load, but his crew signaled him that he would be unable to make it to the finish without another pit stop. The crew borrowed a fuel feed mechanism from Len Sutton's team, and signaled Foyt to the pits.

Foyt gave up the lead on lap 184 for a splash-and-go. That handed the lead to Sachs, who was now leading by 25 seconds. With three laps to go, the warning tread showed on Sachs' rear tire and Sachs decided to play it safe. Rather than nurse the car around, he pitted to replace the worn tire on lap 197. Foyt took the lead with three laps to go and won his first (of four) Indy 500 victories by a margin of 8.28 seconds.

A notable story included the appearance of two-time defending Formula One World Champion Jack Brabham from Australia, who drove the race in a low-slung, British built Cooper powered by a Coventry Climax engine. Dubbed the "British Invasion," it would be the first notable post-war appearance of a rear-engined car, and within five years the rear-engined revolution would take over the Speedway. The venerable front-engined roadsters with their larger and more powerful engines were much faster down the long straights, but the superior handling of Brabham's Cooper in the corners kept his car competitive. Brabham qualified 17th at 145.144 mp/h and drove the car to a respectable 9th-place finish, completing all 200 laps. He had planned to run conservatively and make only two pit stops, but tire wear and fuel consumption forced him to make a 3rd stop, negating his strategy. Had he driven more aggressively with three pit stops, he might have been much closer to the lead serial.

Five months after the race in October 1961, the front straight of the track was paved over with asphalt, and thus the entire track was now paved in asphalt and only a single yard of bricks at the start/finish line was left exposed from the original 1909 brick surface. The remainder of the original 3,200,000 bricks now lie underneath the asphalt surface. This meant that the 1961 race was the last 500 in which cars raced on the original bricks other than those at the start/finish line.

Practice and time trials
Nicknamed the "Tinley Park Express," Tony Bettenhausen, Sr. was killed in a crash during a practice run on May 12. He was testing a car for Paul Russo. It was determined that an anchor bolt fell off the front radius rod support, permitting the front axle to twist and mis-align the front wheels when the brakes were applied. The car plunged into the outside wall, then rode along the top, snapping fence poles and tearing segments of the catch fence. The car came to rest upside-down on top of the outside wall, and Bettenhausen was killed instantly. Before the time trials Bettenhausen had been the favorite to become the first driver to break the 150 mph barrier at the Speedway.

Time trials was scheduled for four days:
Saturday May 13 – Pole Day time trials
Sunday May 14 – Second day time trials
Saturday May 20 – Third day time trials
Sunday May 21 – Fourth day time trials

Eddie Sachs sat on the pole with an average speed of 147.481 mph (237.348 km/h).

Box score

Alternates
First alternate: Paul Russo (#21, #24)

Failed to qualify

Chuck Arnold (#62)
Harry Beck  (#95) – Entry declined, lack of experience
Tony Bettenhausen (#15, #24) – Fatal accident
Bert Brooks  (#79)
Duane Carter (#61, #64)
Bob Cleberg  (#6)
Leon Clum  (#77)
Russ Congdon  (#69)
Ray Crawford (#94)
Ronnie Duman  (#43)
Jack Ensley  (#84)
Cotton Farmer  (#23)
Don Freeland (#27, #47)
Chuck Hulse  (#37)
Danny Jones  (#47)
Ralph Ligouri  (#75)
Mike Magill (#82)
Jim McWithey (#29)
Bill Randall  (#95)
Chuck Rodee  (#89)
Jack Rounds  (#44, #87)
Bud Tingelstad (#54)
Bob Veith (#23, #25, #44, #85)
Bob Wente  (#88)
Chuck Weyant (#88)

Race statistics

Track worker fatality
John Masariu, 38 father of 6, of Danville, Indiana was serving as a member of the fire/safety crew. On the 127th lap of the race, driver Eddie Johnson spun out in turn 4, but did not suffer significant damage and he was not injured. A small fire broke out on the car. A safety fire truck went to his aid. John Masariu, who was the principal of Ben Davis Junior High and was serving as a safety worker, fell or jumped off the back of the fire truck. A moment later, the truck driven by James (Johnny) Williams accidentally backed over him, and he was injured fatally.

Broadcasting

Radio
The race was carried live on the IMS Radio Network. Sid Collins served as chief announcer with Fred Agabashian serving as "driver expert" The broadcast represented the 10th anniversary of the network, which was formed in 1952. This was Mike Ahern's first year on the network. This was Ahern's only year in Turn 2.

The broadcast was heard on over 450 affiliates, including Armed Forces Radio. The broadcast reached all 50 U.S. states. The race reached approximately 100 million listeners worldwide.

Television
The race itself was not televised in full. However, ABC Sports showed highlights of time trials and a few minutes of film clips of the race on Wide World of Sports.

Gallery

Notes

References

Works cited
Indianapolis 500 History: Race & All-Time Stats - Official Site
1961 Indianapolis 500 Radio Broadcast, Indianapolis Motor Speedway Radio Network

Indianapolis 500 races
Indianapolis 500
Indiana Hoosiers Indiana
1961 in American motorsport
May 1961 sports events in the United States